Eudonia liebmanni is a species of moth in the family Crambidae. It is found on Corsica.

The wingspan is 16-18.5 mm.

References

Moths described in 1904
Eudonia
Moths of Europe